Woodard Bay Natural Resources Conservation Area is a natural reserve in Olympia, Washington protected under the Washington Natural Areas Program. Once an important processing facility for the logging industry, it has been designated as the Weyerhaeuser South Bay Log Dump Rural Historic Landscape. Today the area is a renowned sanctuary for a variety of birds, harbor seals, river otters, bald eagles, and a colony of bats, as well as serving as an important great blue heron rookery. A recent conservation program in the area between the State of Washington and the Nature Conservancy is the first of its kind in the country.

History 
American Indians use of the area dates back over 5,000 years when the present coast line stabilised. Euroamerican settlement began in the 1850s with Puget Sound's logging era. The bay was named after Harvey and Solome Woodard, pioneers who arrived in 1853.

In the 1920s the site was bought by the Weyerhaeuser Timber Company, which brought up to 1 million board feet of timber here annually by rail from all over Thurston and Lewis counties until it closed the site in 1984. A former logging railroad crosses Woodard Bay on a wooden trestle and a narrow peninsula. It runs out onto a pier in Henderson Inlet across the mouth of Chapman Bay. Here logs were dumped in the water, gathered into rafts and floated to mills in Everett, Washington.

Features 

 The  features a maturing second-growth forest edging five miles (8 km) of shoreline at Woodard and Chapman bays on Henderson Inlet. The shallow, saltwater bays are largely undeveloped and has attracted wildlife not usually seen so close to an urban area. A colony of bats inhabits the underside of a railroad pier closed to the public. According to a zoologist with the Washington State Department of Natural Resources, "The number of bats found in the area around Woodard Bay may have been similar to the numbers that use the pier today, but they roosted at many locations across the countryside rather than all in one location." Harbor seals rest on old log booms outside of Chapman bay, in addition to the pigeon guillemots, cormorants and a purple martin colony who roost in the area. Chapman Bay is closed to boaters, to protect nesting eagles and a heron rookery (which moved to Woodard Bay in 2004). Woodard Bay is closed from Labor Day to April 1 to protect wintering waterfowl.

The Washington Department of Natural Resources natural conservation area program was approved by the Washington State Legislature in 1987 to preserve fish and wildlife habitat while also providing a place for passive recreation, research and education. Woodard Bay was one of the four original conservation areas statewide.

A new kind of marine conservation effort began at Woodard Bay when The Nature Conservancy signed a 10-year lease with the Washington Department of Natural Resources to restore  of sub-tidal land in Henderson Inlet near the mouth of Woodard Bay to bring back the once-abundant Olympia oyster. The lease is the first of its kind in the country.

Facilities 

Facilities include group meeting areas for small school groups, picnic tables, benches and a toilet. A camp car once used as a cookhouse and later an office has been refurbished to represent its former uses, much of the work done by the Washington Conservation Corps as well as labor by prisoners from the Cedar Creek Correctional Center. The site is near the northernmost trailhead of the Chehalis Western Trail. As bicycle riding is prohibited in Woodard Bay NRCAA, a sheltered bike rack is provided for bicyclists.

See also
 History of Olympia, Washington

References

External links 

 Woodard Bay Natural Resources Conservation Area Management Plan. Washington State Department of Natural Resources. Retrieved 8/3/08.
 Woodard Bay Bat Colony. Bats About Our Town. Retrieved 9/5/09.
 Woodard Bay Natural Resources Conservation Area. Washington State Department of Natural Resources. Retrieved  2/18/18.
 Woodard Bay Aquatic Conservation Lease. The Nature Conservancy. Retrieved 9/5/09.

Parks in Olympia, Washington
Nature reserves in Washington (state)
National Register of Historic Places in Olympia, Washington
Washington Natural Areas Program
Protected areas of Thurston County, Washington
Weyerhaeuser
Historic districts on the National Register of Historic Places in Washington (state)
Protected areas established in 1928
1928 establishments in Washington (state)